Carla Neisen (born 8 March 1996) is a French rugby player who plays as a center for the Blagnac women's rugby club and for the France women's national rugby union team since 2012.

Neisen competed at the 2020 Tokyo Summer Olympics, where the team won a silver medal. She competed at the 2022 Rugby World Cup Sevens and won a bronze medal.

Family 
She is the younger sister of Anderson Neisen, and the cousin of rugby player Enzo Hervé.

Awards 
 Ordre national du Mérite (8 September 2021 decree)

References 

French rugby league players
French rugby sevens players
1996 births
Living people
Olympic rugby sevens players of France
Olympic medalists in rugby sevens
Olympic silver medalists for France
Rugby sevens players at the 2020 Summer Olympics
Medalists at the 2020 Summer Olympics
France international women's rugby sevens players